Judenjagd (German: “Hunt for Jews”) were German-conducted searches, beginning in 1942, for Jews who were in hiding in German-occupied Poland. The term was introduced by Christopher R. Browning. Targeted in the searches were Jews concealed among the Polish gentile population or in the forests—generally escapees from ghetto liquidations and deportations to Nazi concentration camps.

Victims
By some estimates, in these circumstances, as many as 200,000 Jews may have been killed, may have died of starvation or exposure, or may have been delivered to German occupiers. From October 1941, persons helping Jews in occupied Poland were punished by Germans with the death penalty.

In 2018 Tomasz Frydel reviewed and reassessed the "perpetrator role" of ordinary Poles, discussed in Jan Grabowski's book, Hunt for the Jews. Frydel described the whole Nazi German terror system that was directed not only against Jews but against non-Jewish Poles, including the Polish underground, Soviet prisoners of war, Roma, and others. German police in occupied Poland used sting operations, sometimes employing Jews, to find and kill rescuers of the Germans' quarries.

References

The Holocaust in Poland
Holocaust perpetrators in Poland